Intelectin-1, also known as omentin or intestinal lactoferrin receptor, is an intelectin encoded in humans by the ITLN1 gene. Intelectin-1 functions both as a receptor for bacterial arabinogalactans and for lactoferrin.

Having conserved ligand binding site residues, both human and mouse intelectin-1 bind the exocyclic vicinal diol of carbohydrate ligands such as galactofuranose.

See also 
 Intelectin

References

Further reading